Sanju Devi is an Indian politician and current member of 17th Legislative Assembly of Uttar Pradesh of India. Shyam Babu Gupta has big hand in making her MLA. She represents the Tanda constituency of Ambedkar Nagar from Uttar Pradesh and is a member of  Bharatiya Janata Party.

Political career
Sanju Devi has been a member of the 17th Legislative Assembly of Uttar Pradesh. Since 2017 she represents the Tanda constituency and is a member of the Bharatiya Janata Party.

Posts held

See also
Uttar Pradesh Legislative Assembly

References

Far-right politicians in India
Uttar Pradesh MLAs 2017–2022
Bharatiya Janata Party politicians from Uttar Pradesh
Living people
People from Ambedkar Nagar district
Year of birth missing (living people)